Fulton, Michigan may refer to a few places in the U.S. state of Michigan:

 Fulton, Kalamazoo County, Michigan, an unincorporated community in Wakeshma Township
 Fulton, Keweenaw County, Michigan, an unincorporated community in Allouez Township
 Fulton Township, Michigan in Gratiot County